Big Bow (1833–c. 1900) was a Kiowa war leader during the 19th century, an associate of Guipago and Satanta.

Big Bow's name in Kiowa is Zepko-ette, also spelled Za-ko-yea. He was born in Elk Creek in Indian Territory in 1833.

He was active in the Southern Plains, in the present day states of Kansas, Oklahoma, and Texas. Big Bow raided native and non-native settlements and took part in the Warren Wagon Train Raid, on May 18, 1871 on Salt Creek Prairie in Texas, along with Satank, Satanta, Mamanti, Tsen-tainte (White Horse), Ado-ete (Big Tree), Fast Bear, Yellow Wolf, Eagle Head.

But Satanta, while asking the Indian Agent on the Kiowa-Comanche Reservation for ammunition and supplies, bragged that he had led the war party at Salt Creek Prairie, and told Satank and young war leader Ado-ete (Big Tree) were there too; he didn't call the names of Mamanti, Tsen-tainte (White Horse), Fast Bear, Yellow Wolf, Eagle Head, so they weren't arrested.

On April 20, 1872 Zepko-ete and Tsen-tainte, with about one hundred of their Kiowa warriors and Comanche allies, attacked a government wagon train at Howard Wells station, along the San Antonio - El Paso trail, killing 17 Mexicans and kidnapping a woman; two companies (A and H) of 9th Cavalry from Fort Clark, led by capt. N. Cooney and lt. F. R. Vincent, got the Indians, but were forced to retreat after suffering two casualties (lt. Vincent himself, deadly wounded, and a "Buffalo Soldier"; ten Indians (four in the assault on the wagon train and six in the fight against the "Buffalo Soldiers") were reported to have been killed.

Big Bow joined Guipago and the Comanche under Quanah and made a name for himself in the Comanche Campaign and the Red River War; he was one of the last to surrender (following Tene-angopte's advice), in January 1875, to the United States, before Guipago's surrendering on February 25, 1875.

Committed to anti-white ideals and a path of resistive violence, Big Bow refused to sign the Treaty of Medicine Lodge in 1867, which relocated the Kiowa and Comanche to live together on a reservation in western Oklahoma and Texas.   Although failed, Big Bow also participated in the Battle of Adobe Walls, a violent struggle in an attempt to push invaders out from hunting buffalo on their tribal lands.  His defiance and frustration against the white-washing of his land and traditions revealed itself through his violent endeavors and actions.  So committed to bloodshed to fight for his beliefs, Thomas Battey, a Quaker missionary close to the tribe, commented on his ferocious countenance.  Determined to preserve his lands, he was devoted to violence as an enforcer. When the Kiowas were forced onto their reservation in 1875, Tene-angopte didn't include him in the number of Kiowa chiefs and warriors to be deported to Fort Marion, Florida, and Big Bow and his family settled near Rainy Mountain in Indian Territory.

See also

Dohasan
Satank
Guipago
Satanta
Mamanti
Tene-angopte
Tsen-tainte
Ado-ete

Notes

References 

Kiowa people
Native American leaders
1833 births
1900s deaths
Year of death uncertain
19th-century Native Americans